Krishna Mohan Shrestha was the first Inspector General of Armed Police Force (Nepal).

Shrestha was killed by the Maoist insurgents  during the Maoist insurgency in Nepal. Krishna Mohan along with his wife and bodyguard was assassinated on the morning of 25 January 2003 by gunmen in Lalitpur, while he was taking a morning walk as they used to do on Sunday mornings, intending to represent general safety to fellow citizens. The Inspector General and his wife, who was a teacher at an international school in the capital, were both unarmed. His wife Nudup Shrestha was a senior teacher in the Lincoln School, Kathmandu.

References

External links
 http://www.apf.gov.np/index.php?c=3&lan=en

Nepalese murder victims
People murdered in Nepal
2003 deaths
Year of birth missing